is a tile-matching puzzle video game released by Sega for the Game Gear in 1995. It was later included on the Coleco Sonic, along with the original Columns, to which it is a sequel.

Gameplay
Super Columns enhanced the classic Columns gameplay by adding new types of blocks and the ability to turn the lines of blocks. New blocks include glitter columns (which remove gems of a certain type from the grid), reversal columns (which flip the grid upside-down), magic columns (which clears all gems above a section), and lanterns (which can clear a whole row, column, or grid).

The main gameplay mode is "Story," wherein the player is pitted against an evil merchant, Surhand, who wants to harness the power of a mystical amulet in order to conquer all of Phoenicia. The player must defeat five opponents thrice each in order to advance in the game. During story matches, both the player and the player's opponents can unleash various spells, indicated by a numbered display that ascends as gems are matched. Each spell has a different effect, such as increasing the speed at which opponent columns fall, or restricting the opponent's ability to rotate their columns. Like in previous Columns games, there are also "Endless" and "Flash" modes available. In an "Endless" game, the player matches gems until inevitably reaching a game-over. "Flash" mode presents the player with 10 puzzle stages where all flashing gems must be matched in order to progress to the next stage.

Reception
GamePro gave Super Columns a positive review. They praised the variety of addictive game modes, simple controls, and clean graphics.

See also
 Tetris 2

References

External links
 

1995 video games
Falling block puzzle games
Game Gear games
Game Gear-only games
Sega video games
Video games developed in Japan